BC Kryvbas, is a professional basketball club based in Kryvyi Rih, Ukraine.

Achievements of the team were winning the Ukrainian Basketball League in 2009, and winning the Higher League in 2003 and 2004.

Kryvbas withdrew from the 2016–17 Ukrainian Basketball SuperLeague in January 2017.

Names
2000–2002: BC Basket Kryvyi Rih
2002–2009: BC Kryvbasbasket
2009–2017: SC Kryvbas
Since 2021: BC Kryvbas

Honors
Ukrainian Super League
Champions (1): 2008–09
Higher League
Winners (2): 2002–03, 2003–04
Ukrainian Cup
Runners-up (1): 2016

Players

Notable players

 Darius Adams

References
GeneralSpecific

Basketball teams in Ukraine
Sport in Kryvyi Rih
Basketball teams established in 2000
2000 establishments in Ukraine